Wills Branch is a stream in Madison and St. Francois counties in the U.S. state of Missouri. It is a tributary of the Little St. Francis River.

The stream flows south-southeast passing under Missouri Route DD two miles northeast of Knob Lick. It is impounded as Nims Lake on the St Francois-Madison county line and enters the Little St. Francis River in Madison County approximately three-quarters of a mile southeast of the Nims Lake dam.

Wills Branch has the name of a black settler in the area.

See also
List of rivers of Missouri

References

Rivers of Madison County, Missouri
Rivers of St. Francois County, Missouri
Rivers of Missouri